Isoguanine or 2-hydroxyadenine is a purine base that is an isomer of guanine.  It is a product of oxidative damage to DNA and has been shown to cause mutation.  It is also used in combination with isocytosine in studies of unnatural nucleic acid analogues of the normal base pairs in DNA.

It is used as a nucleobase of hachimoji nucleic acids. In hachimoji DNA, it pairs with 1-methylcytosine, while in hachimoji RNA, it pairs with isocytosine.

References

Purines
Nucleobases